For the spin-off television show L.A. Heat, see L.A. Heat (TV series).
L.A. Heat is a 1989 police film directed by Joseph Merhi and starring Lawrence Hilton-Jacobs and Jim Brown. The film follows Detective Jon Chance, a Los Angeles detective who dreams of being a cowboy hero and living by "the code of the West," as he is assigned to track down a violent drug dealer.

Plot Summary
Jon Chance, an L.A. vice cop who is a man who dreamed of being a cowboy hero. He saw himself as an exemplary hero who always felt that the use of guns was not a necessity. However, Chance needs to stop dreaming. He needed to return to the real world! Jon Chance gets an assignment which he can't say no to and has to accept, to bust a drug dealer named Clarence. The case later gets personal when Carl, Chance's partner get killed by Clarence during a routine drug bust. A drug war will soon ensue between Clarence, who is trying to retrieve his drugs and money, and the police...

Cast
 Lawrence Hilton-Jacobs as Jon Chance
 Jim Brown as Captain
 Kevin Benton as Clarence
 Myles Thoroughgood as Spyder
 Trish Johnson as Jane
 John Henry Richardson as Boris
 Robert Gallo as Sylvio

Reception
TV Guide gave the film two stars out of four, calling it "A reasonably entertaining low-budget crime thriller".

Legacy
The film was a success on home video and was followed by three sequels, Angels of the City (1989), L.A. Vice (1989), and Chance (1990), in which Lawrence Hilton-Jacobs reprises his role as Detective Jon Chance.

References

External links

1980s crime films
American police detective films
1989 films
American independent films
Films directed by Joseph Merhi
1980s English-language films
1980s American films